Gianni Ryan Stensness (born 7 February 1999) is an Australian professional soccer player who plays as a centre-back for Norwegian Eliteserien club Viking FK. A former youth international for New Zealand, Stensness plays for the Australia national team.

Club career

Wellington Phoenix
In March 2019, Stensness was promoted to the Wellington Phoenix first team from their reserves. On 9 March 2019, he played his first professional game for the club. He came on as a substitute for Mandi in an 8–2 win over his former side, Central Coast Mariners. In June 2019, he left Wellington Phoenix to explore opportunities in Europe.

Central Coast Mariners
Stensness returned from Europe and was offered a contract with Wellington Phoenix, but decided to sign a one-year contract with Central Coast Mariners in August 2019 as a midfielder. After a strong start to the 2019–20 season, Stensness signed  a two-year extension on his contract, through to 2022. His performances in the 2019–20 season earned him the CCM Goal of the Year and Newcomer of the Year awards.  Stensness also had the most tackles in the A-league in the 2019–20 season and gained the highest OPTA score of any player in the team. Stensness showed himself to be one of the strongest and most commanding defensive midfielders in the A-league in season 20/21.

Viking FK
On 9 August 2021, he signed a three-year contract with Norwegian club Viking FK. He made his debut for the club on 29 August 2021, in a 2–1 win against Rosenborg.

International career
Eligible for both Australia and New Zealand (Australia via birth, New Zealand via paternal birth), 17-year old Stensness was named by Ufuk Talay in an Australian under-20 national team training camp on 31 January 2017. In August 2017, Stensness was part of the under-20 team who played in a Tri Series against the Western Australia state team and against the Singapore national under-19 football team.

On 11 February 2019, Stensness was invited by New Zealand under-20 national team coach Des Buckingham to a talent identification camp in Auckland. On 23 March 2019 he declared his desire to represent New Zealand.

On 28 May 2019, Stensness scored his first goal for New Zealand at the U-20 World Cup against Norway, helping his team advance to the round of 16.

In September 2021, Stensness decided to represent Australia internationally. He debuted with Australia in a 2–0 2022 FIFA World Cup qualification loss to Japan on 24 March 2022.

Career statistics

References

External links

1999 births
Living people
Soccer players from Brisbane
Australian soccer players
Australia international soccer players
Australia youth international soccer players
New Zealand association footballers
New Zealand youth international footballers
New Zealand under-23 international footballers
Australian expatriate soccer players
New Zealand expatriate association footballers
Australian people of New Zealand descent
New Zealand people of Australian descent
Association football midfielders
Wellington Phoenix FC players
Central Coast Mariners FC players
Viking FK players
National Premier Leagues players
A-League Men players
Eliteserien players
Footballers at the 2020 Summer Olympics
Olympic association footballers of New Zealand
Expatriate footballers in Norway
Australian expatriate sportspeople in Norway
New Zealand expatriate sportspeople in Norway
New Zealand under-20 international footballers
Australia under-20 international soccer players